The Romano R.15 was an amphibious aircraft built in France by Romano in the early 1930s.

Design and development
The R.15 was a high-wing floatplane of all-metal construction. The pilot and passenger were seated in an enclosed cabin. It first flew in 1933 and showed good flight characteristics, but failed to win orders from the civil aviation industry.

Specifications

References

Amphibious aircraft
R.15
Single-engined tractor aircraft
High-wing aircraft
Aircraft first flown in 1933